Peter Rabbit 2: The Runaway (also known simply as Peter Rabbit 2) is a 2021 3D adventure comedy film directed and produced by Will Gluck, who co-wrote the screenplay with Patrick Burleigh. The film is a sequel to 2018's Peter Rabbit produced by Sony Pictures Animation, and is based on the stories of Peter Rabbit created by Beatrix Potter. James Corden reprises his role as the title character, alongside Rose Byrne, Domhnall Gleeson, and David Oyelowo in live-action roles, and the voices of Elizabeth Debicki, Lennie James, and Margot Robbie.

After facing numerous delays from its original February 2020 release date due to the COVID-19 pandemic, the film was released theatrically by Sony Pictures Releasing under its Columbia Pictures label, first in Australia on March 25, 2021, then in the United Kingdom on May 17 and in the United States on June 11. The film grossed $154 million worldwide.  The film received positive reviews on Rotten Tomatoes, which called it "enjoyably silly and self-aware".  On Metacritic, it received mixed reviews.

Plot
Thomas and Bea get married, with all their friends, human and animal, attending, and Peter accepts this new part of his life. After their honeymoon, Thomas helps Bea as she works on her children’s storybooks based on Peter and his friends. Peter is a bit dismayed to know that the books have portrayed him as “naughty”, and does not want to think about Thomas and Bea starting their own family without him. Bea then gets a letter in the mail from a publisher who wants to distribute her books.

Thomas and Bea take Peter, Benjamin, Flopsy, Mopsy, and Cottontail to meet the publisher, Nigel Basil-Jones. The other rabbits, barring a suspicious Cottontail, seem to like Nigel, until he presents his marketing plan toward the rabbits, which paints Peter as a troublemaker. They even see a billboard for a potential Peter Rabbit movie, which makes him look outright villainous.

A dismayed Peter walks away from the group and goes into town, where he meets an older rabbit named Barnabas. After getting into some more mischief, Barnabas recognizes Peter as the son of his old friend when they would swipe food from the McGregor farm. He is impressed with Peter’s movements and skills, but they are unfortunately caught by animal catchers, who take them to a pet pound, where they were taken in by a little girl named Amelia. After an afternoon spent being washed and roughly played with, the family steps out of the house, leaving Peter and Barnabas in a cage. Barnabas manages to free himself and Peter, so they go to raid the family’s fridge with the help of Barnabas’ crew. As they try to sneak the food out, Amelia’s mother comes back intending to get rid of the rabbits before her kids come home. The animals manage to run from her as she chases them into town, and they get away with their food into their hideout. Barnabas later takes Peter through the town as he talks about how his father used to steal for Peter and his sisters to keep their bellies full. Thomas and Bea then find Peter and bring him home while Barnabas returns to his hideout. The next morning, Peter tells Benjamin about Barnabas and convinces him and his sisters to join him in meeting the crew. Barnabas recognizes Peter’s sisters and divulges to all of them his big plan to rob from the farmers market, with their big score being packs of dried fruit.

Thomas and Bea meet with Nigel again to go over designs for the rabbits, but after already having them dressed up in contemporary clothes, Nigel makes another suggestion that they should be on a beach. Thomas starts to realize that Nigel’s idea are not in the best interests of Bea’s work. He even later goes to confront Nigel himself in a boxing gym to express how he feels, with Nigel interpreting it as him speaking for Bea. She finds out and is unhappy with Thomas.

The rabbits gather help from their animal friends to pull off their heist. The animals create distractions and take out the farmers. The rabbits prepare the bins of dried fruit, but in the chaos, a cheese wheel ran over Thomas and his tomatoes that he was going to sell. After getting the dried fruits into their getaway truck, all the animals, including Benjamin and the sisters, are captured by the pet pound people. To Peter’s dismay, Barnabas reveals he was all along using him and his friends to keep the dried fruit for themselves. He even explains that he intentionally “bumped into” Peter in town after reading about him in his book, having spent a lot of time feeling angry that nobody wanted him because he was too old. Everyone is left to blame Peter for getting them into this mess, while he feels utterly terrible.

Peter leaves Barnabas and his gang and goes to find Thomas, enlisting his help in recovering his friends. After hitting a snag with their truck, they go to Bea for help while she is in a meeting with Nigel and members from the publishing company, who want to put Peter and his friends in a ludicrous space adventure as well as a dangerously unpredictable rescue mission as a way to end the story. Bea realizes this is not what she had in mind, and she pulls her stories from Nigel’s company, thus now knowing that Thomas was absolutely right about Nigel's true intentions. After talking it out with Thomas, she agrees to help him and Peter recover all their friends while going on over-the-top missions to find them.

Peter, Benjamin, and the sisters then make one last stop at Barnabas’s hideout. They take the dried fruit away from them, only for the crew to appear and capture Peter’s family. They then turn the tables on them by having prepared for this, with the rabbits stringing up Barnabas and his crew by nooses so that they get pulled away when the nearby tailor shop owner leaves in his truck. The rabbits then return all the dried fruit to their owners and rejoin Thomas and Bea as they drive home, with Peter deciding to be more willing to listen to the ones that love him.

Cast

Live-action cast
 Rose Byrne as Bea
 Domhnall Gleeson as Thomas McGregor
 David Oyelowo as Nigel Basil-Jones

Voice cast

Production
In May 2018, it was announced that Sony Pictures had started the development of the sequel to Peter Rabbit. In February 2019, it was announced David Oyelowo had joined the cast of the film, with Rose Byrne and Domnhall Gleeson reprising their roles from the first. Elizabeth Debicki and Margot Robbie were confirmed to reprise their respective roles in October 2019.

Unlike the first film, the sequel was not released under the Sony Pictures Animation label, though Columbia Pictures did return for distribution.

Filming
Principal photography began in January 2019 in Centennial Parklands, Australia. Filming took place in the Lake District at Ambleside and Haverthwaite, around Hill Street and Richmond Bridge in London, Gloucester Docks, a replica of the House of the Tailor of Gloucester, and in Camden, New South Wales.

Release
Peter Rabbit 2: The Runaway was theatrically released in Australia on March 25, 2021, in the United Kingdom on May 17, and in the United States on June 11.

It was initially set to be released in the United States on February 7, 2020, before being moved back to April 3, 2020, earlier in Australia on March 19, and in the United Kingdom on March 27. The film was delayed again to August 7, 2020, due to the COVID-19 pandemic. It was then further delayed to January 15, 2021, in the United States, then to April 2, and again to June 11. The date was then moved up to May 14 before moving back again to July 2, then moving up once more to June 18, and then once again back to June 11, following the film's box office success outside of the United States.

Home media
Peter Rabbit 2: The Runaway was released as a purchase on VOD on July 27, 2021, and was released on DVD, Blu-ray and Ultra HD Blu-ray on August 24, 2021 by Sony Pictures Home Entertainment.

Reception

Box office 
Peter Rabbit 2: The Runaway grossed $40.5 million in the United States and Canada, and $113.5 million in other territories, for a worldwide total of $154 million.

In the United States and Canada, Peter Rabbit 2 was released alongside In the Heights and The House Next Door: Meet the Blacks 2 and was projected to gross $16–20 million from 3,346 theaters in its opening weekend, with Sony predicting a more modest $8–10 million debut. The film made $4 million on its first day, including $900,000 from Thursday night previews. It went on to debut to $10.1 million, finishing fourth behind A Quiet Place Part II, In the Heights, and The Conjuring: The Devil Made Me Do It. The film fell 39.8% in its second weekend, grossing $6.1 million and finishing in third. In its third weekend, the film fell 21.5% and grossed $4.8 million, finishing in fourth.

In Australia, the film debuted to $2.1 million. By its third weekend in the country (where it made $2.5 million), the film had a running total of $9.2 million. In the UK, the film topped the charts in the first three days of cinemas reopening, making $6.4 million.

Critical response
The website's critics consensus reads: "An enjoyably silly and self-aware sequel, Peter Rabbit 2: The Runaway should leave fans of the original feeling fairly hoppy." On Metacritic it has a weighted average score of 43 out of 100 based on 13 critics, indicating "mixed or average reviews". Audiences polled by CinemaScore gave the film an average grade of "A−" on an A+ to F scale, while PostTrak reported 74% of audience members gave it a positive score, with 45% saying they would definitely recommend it.

Courtney Howard of Variety called it a "superior sequel" and said the film "serves as both a meta-commentary on his humbling past antics and a pivotal point for the eponymous protagonist." Brian Penn of UK Film Review called it a "great popcorn movie" and said the "voicing actors are undoubtedly the stars even though the humans on screen are perfectly fine."

Ian Freer of Empire rated the film 3 out of 5 stars, writing "It feels a little thin and generic compared to family fare like The Mitchells vs. the Machines, but the Byrne-Gleeson combo is winning and Gluck injects just enough slapstick and smarts to justify the last-gasp gag about a sequel. It's no Paddington 2, but Peter Rabbit 2 works well thanks to a mocking sense of self and a strong second half." However, he noted that "It [Peter Rabbit 2] may not be for the Beatrix Potter purists and has a scattershot quality", but that it "remains enjoyable for its brisk 93 minutes." Peter Bradshaw of The Guardian gave the film 2 out of 5 stars, remarking that "Unlike Paddington, whose literary source material is genuinely funny, this digital Peter Rabbit is never really humorous. It can sometimes be cute or zany and briefly send itself up, but there is fundamentally something pretty straight in its DNA. And so the film rattles inoffensively on, every line and every image seeming as if it has been test marketed in ways advocated by the wicked Nigel Basil-Jones." Christy Lemire of RogerEbert.com also gave the film 2 out of 5 stars, who said "By indulging in the exact same instincts it insists are problematic artistically, “Peter Rabbit 2” wants to have its carrot and eat it, too. But maybe that won't bother you. Maybe you'll be grateful for a return to the theater and the opportunity to do so with your kids. In that regard, the sequel hops along in sufficiently bouncy fashion."

Accolades
At the 11th AACTA Awards, Peter Rabbit 2: The Runaway received nominations for Best Adapted Screenplay, Best Actress, Best Editing, Best Sound, and Best Production Design; and won Best Visual Effects or Animation. The film's visual effects received the Asian Academy Creative Award for Best Visual or Special FX in TV Series or Feature Film at the third ceremony.

Future
In May 2021, Will Gluck said he nearly completed the script for an untitled third Peter Rabbit movie.

References

External links

 
 

2021 films
2021 comedy films
2021 computer-animated films
2020s American animated films
2020s children's adventure films
2020s children's comedy films
2020s children's fantasy films
2020s fantasy comedy films
2020s fantasy adventure films
2020s English-language films
American 3D films
American computer-animated films
American children's animated adventure films
American children's animated comedy films
American children's animated drama films
American children's animated fantasy films
American comedy-drama films
American adventure comedy films
American fantasy adventure films
American sequel films
American films with live action and animation
Australian 3D films
Australian computer-animated films
Australian children's adventure films
Australian children's comedy films
Australian children's drama films
Australian animated fantasy films
Australian comedy-drama films
Australian adventure comedy films
Australian fantasy adventure films
Australian sequel films
British 3D films
British computer-animated films
British children's adventure films
British children's comedy films
British children's drama films
British animated fantasy films
British comedy-drama films
British adventure comedy films
British fantasy adventure films
British sequel films
3D animated films
Peter Rabbit
Peter Rabbit (film series)
Animated films based on children's books
Animated films about rabbits and hares
Animated films about siblings
Animated films about orphans
Animated films about foxes
Films about badgers
Films about hedgehogs
Films about ducks
Films about pigs
Animated films about cats
Films about runaways
Animated films set in London
Animated films set in England
Films shot in England
Films directed by Will Gluck
Films scored by Dominic Lewis
Films postponed due to the COVID-19 pandemic
Columbia Pictures films
Columbia Pictures animated films
Animal Logic films
2020s British films